Salamina is a town and municipality in the Department of Magdalena, northern Colombia.

 Area: 175 km².
 Elevation: 6 meters
 Population: 11,293
 Rural: 5,337
 Urban: 5,956
 Agricultural products: livestock, corn, tomatoes, yuca

Points of interest
 Bolivar's house in 1812
 Church of Our Lady of Carmen

References

External links
 Salamina official website
 Government of Magdalena - Salamina

Municipalities of Magdalena Department